Kiss of Life often refers to:

 Mouth-to-mouth resuscitation, a form of artificial ventilation

Kiss of Life may also refer to:

Albums 
Kiss of Life (Siedah Garrett album), 1988
Kiss of Life, a 1989 album by the Gothic rock band Gene Loves Jezebel

Songs 
 "Kiss of Life" (Sade song), 1992
 "Kiss of Life" (Ken Hirai song), 2001
 "Kiss of Life" (Friendly Fires song), 2003
 "Kiss of Life" (Supergrass song), 2004
 "Kiss of Life" (Kylie Minogue and Jessie Ware song), 2021
 "Kiss of Life", a 1982 song by Peter Gabriel from Security
 "Kiss of Life", a 1993 song by the Bee Gees from Size Isn't Everything

Other uses 
 Kiss of Life (2003 film), a 2003 British drama film
 Kiss of Life (2007 film), a 2007 Greek romantic comedy film
"Kiss of Life", a photograph by Rocco Morabito
Kiss of Life, 2009 zombie novel, the sequel to Generation Dead